Marianne Janack is an American philosopher and John Stewart Kennedy Professor of Philosophy at Hamilton College.
She is the president of the Richard Rorty Society. She was the Phi Bet Kappa Romanell Professor of Philosophy in 2017-18.

Books
 What We Mean By Experience, Stanford University Press 2012
 Feminist Interpretations of Richard Rorty, Penn State University Press 2010

References

External links
Marianne Janack

 https://www.bookxi.org/

Living people
21st-century American philosophers
Hamilton College (New York) faculty
Philosophers of science
Philosophers of mind
American women philosophers
Syracuse University alumni
Colgate University alumni
Feminist philosophers
Philosophers of literature
1964 births